Bulbul coronavirus HKU11 (Bulbul-CoV HKU11) is a positive-sense single-stranded RNA Deltacoronavirus of avian origin found in Chinese bulbuls.

References 

Deltacoronaviruses
Bird diseases
Animal viral diseases